Ariosoma opistophthalmum is an eel in the family Congridae (conger/garden eels). It was described by Camillo Ranzani in 1839, originally under the genus Conger. It is a rare, non-migratory marine, deep water-dwelling eel which is known from the southwestern Atlantic Ocean around Brazil, where it ranges from Bahia to São Paulo. It is known to dwell at a depth range of 110–600 metres. Males can reach a maximum total length of 27.2 centimetres.

References

opistophthalmum
Fish described in 1839
Taxa named by Camillo Ranzani